Lameia (minor planet designation: 248 Lameia) is a typical main belt asteroid. Its orbital plane is inclined by 4° to the plane of the ecliptic.

On 27 June 1998 an occultation of the 8th magnitude star PPM 236753 (HD 188960) by 248 Lameia was timed by five observers near Gauteng, South Africa. The chords produced a rough size estimate of a  ellipse. The rotation rate of this object is commensurate with the rotation of the Earth, requiring observations from different locations to build a complete light curve.

Infrared imaging of this body shows a relatively featureless spectra that suggests materials that are similar to carbonaceous chondrite meteorites.

References

External links
The Asteroid Orbital Elements Database
Minor Planet Discovery Circumstances
Asteroid Lightcurve Data File
 
 

Background asteroids
Lameia
Lameia
18850605
Objects observed by stellar occultation